Maximilian Cross Véronneau is a Canadian professional ice hockey forward who is currently playing with the San Jose Barracuda in the American Hockey League (AHL) while under contract to the San Jose Sharks of the National Hockey League (NHL). Véronneau played junior ice hockey in his hometown of Ottawa, then joined the Princeton University Tigers. After completing his senior season at Princeton, he signed as a free agent with the Ottawa Senators of the NHL.

Playing career
After playing junior 'A' ice hockey in Ottawa, Ontario, with the Gloucester Rangers, Véronneau entered Princeton University in 2015. In his junior year 2017–18, Veronneau placed second in NCAA Division 1 scoring with 17 goals and 38 assists for 55 points in 36 games. In 2017, Véronneau attended the Vegas Golden Knights' development camp. After four seasons with the Princeton Tigers, Véronneau was regarded as one of the top NCAA free agents. He signed as a free agent with his hometown Senators in March 2019, signing a two-year entry-level contract. He made his NHL debut on March 14, 2019, against the St. Louis Blues. Véronneau was named the third star of the game.

Véronneau was traded to the Toronto Maple Leafs on February 19, 2020, in exchange for Aaron Luchuk and a conditional 6th round draft pick (depending on how many games Véronneau plays for the team). He played in just 3 regular season games with AHL affiliate, the Toronto Marlies, before the season was abandoned due to the COVID-19 pandemic.

As a free agent from the Maple Leafs, and with the 2020–21 North American season delayed due to the pandemic, Véronneau opted to sign his first contract abroad in agreeing to a contract for the remainder of the season with Swedish club, IK Oskarshamn of the Swedish Hockey League (SHL), on December 21, 2020. In the top Swedish tier, Véronneau regained his offensive confidence, potting 12 goals through 25 regular season games with IK Oskarshamn.

On April 21, 2021, Véronneau opted to transfer to fellow SHL club, Leksands IF, agreeing to a two-year contract. In the following 2021–22 season, he established himself as one of the top offensive players in the SHL, and was signed to a further one-year extension with Leksands through 2024 during the season on November 20, 2021. He completed the season, leading the league with 34 goals through 51 games and was named the SHL's most valuable player.

On April 14, 2022, Véronneau used his NHL out clause in order to sign a one-year, two-way contract with the San Jose Sharks.

Personal
Véronneau's parents are Marc Véronneau and Pamela Cross. Véronneau's sister Sophie plays ice hockey for Yale University. Véronneau is a graduate of École secondaire catholique Franco-Cité in Ottawa, where he also played football and lacrosse.

Career statistics

Awards and honours

References

External links

1995 births
Living people
AHCA Division I men's ice hockey All-Americans
Belleville Senators players
Canadian ice hockey right wingers
Ice hockey people from Ottawa
IK Oskarshamn players
Leksands IF players
Ottawa Senators players
Princeton Tigers men's ice hockey players
San Jose Barracuda players
Toronto Marlies players
Undrafted National Hockey League players